Mavri Sinia or Mavri Schinia is a mountain in Neo Chorio in the Paphos District of Cyprus. The terrain around Mavri Schinia is hilly on the east, but flat in the west and the sea is in the northwest. The average rainfall here is  annually. January is the wettest month with an average of  precipitation. August is the driest with only  precipitation.

Climate

References 

Mountains of Cyprus